Clive Hart Day (February 11, 1871 – July 27, 1951) was an American college professor and the author of History of Commerce. He was chief of the Balkan Division of the American Commission to Negotiate Peace in Paris in 1918–19.

Day was born in Hartford, Connecticut. He graduated from Yale University in 1892, where he was a member of Skull and Bones, and won the John Addison Porter Prize. He took postgraduate studies at the Humboldt University of Berlin and the University of Paris. Day taught history and economics at the University of California for three years and economics at Sheffield Scientific School (Yale) for two years. In 1907 he was appointed professor of economic history at Yale University.

Publications  
 
 History of Commerce (1907; revised and enlarged edition, 1922)   
 The Question of the Balkans, a brochure (1920)

References

External links
 Clive Day papers (MS 173). Manuscripts and Archives, Yale University Library. 
 

Yale University faculty
Yale University alumni
Writers from Hartford, Connecticut
Economists from Connecticut
1871 births
1951 deaths
University of California faculty
University of Paris alumni
Humboldt University of Berlin alumni
American education writers
American economics writers
American male non-fiction writers
American expatriates in France
Historians from Connecticut